During the 1986–87 season, Middlesbrough participated in the Football League Third Division following their relegation the previous season. They were promoted back to the Second Division at the end of the season having finished second in the league.

Team kit and sponsors
During the 1986–87 season, Middlesbrough maintained the white band on their home kit from the previous two seasons and were sponsored by Dickens.

Season review

Pre-season panic

The financial problems that had been plaguing the club since the early 1980s almost led the club into extinction following their relegation the previous season.

After Alf Duffield's resignation near the end of the previous season, Boro had been operating without a chairman. On 21 May 1986, the worst fears of Middlesbrough fans were realised. Debts believed to be in the region of £2 million meant the club were forced to call in the provisional liquidator. Late in July, the Inland Revenue took the club to court, claiming that it was owed £115,156 in tax arrears and so the judge issued a winding up order. On the second of August, Bruce Rioch and twenty-nine other non-playing staff were sacked by the Official Receiver and the gates of Ayresome Park were padlocked. Some players chose to remain and train under Rioch and coach Colin Todd, while others chose to leave.

Steve Gibson approached the local council, ICI and Graham Fordy of Scottish & Newcastle for help. An advert was placed in The Times for help, and Henry Moszkowicz was one of those who replied. Gibson reached an agreement with former chairman Alf Duffield, who was owed £500,000, that he would wind up the company. Clubs in less serious situations had previously used liquidation to get out of problems, but when it came to Middlesbrough's turn, the Football League showed a lack of support.

The council was unable to meet its £200,000 share of the pot to help the club, meaning Gibson and Moszkowicz had to raise their inputs. Three days before the start of the season, the league introduced a ruling meaning the club had to have £350,000 in working capital and show it could pay all creditors 100 pence in the pound. The death of the club was then announced on Tyne Tees Television.

A meeting with the Football League took place on Friday 22 August. Notes were passed from room to room between the league's representatives and the consortium. Colin Henderson agreed a deal with ICI for a bond, meaning that they would pick up a major part of any subsequent debt, and the consortium put in their £825,000. With ten minutes to spare before the registration deadline, the documents were signed by Graham Fordy, Reg Corbridge and Henry Moszkowicz. In recognition of Henderson's achievements in delivering the bond in a format acceptable to everyone, he was named chairman of Middlesbrough Football & Athletic Company (1986) Ltd., the new company formed by the purchase of Blackplay Ltd., a dead company, off the shelf. Gibson, Fordy, Corbridge and Moszkowicz formed the board. The club had been saved and the deal was announced to the public at the town hall.

Football League Third Division

Results

League table

Cup Reviews

League Cup

FA Cup

Squad

Senior squad
The following are all the players who were involved the Middlesbrough F.C. first team at some point during the 1986-87 season.

Coaching staff
Manager: Bruce Rioch
Assistant manager: Colin Todd

Transfers
Players Out
Mitch Cook to Scarborough free
Gary Rowell to Brighton and Hove Albion free
David Currie to Darlington free
Peter Beagrie to Sheffield United £37,500 (tribunal)
Tony McAndrew to Darlington free
David Mills to Darlington free
Don O'Riordan to Grimsby Town free
Tony Hall released
Irving Nattrass retired

Players In
Paul Proudlock from South Bank £2,000
Paul Kerr from Aston Villa £35,000
Ronnie Coyle from Celtic loan
David Hodgson from Norwich City loan
Steve Spriggs from Cambridge United loan
Kevin Carr from Newcastle non contract

References and notes

Middlesbrough F.C. seasons
Middlesbrough